Macajah Marchand "Mack" Eggleston Jr. (September 16, 1896 – September, 1980) was an American baseball catcher and outfielder in the Negro leagues. He played from 1919 to 1934 with over a dozen teams. He also served as manager of the Wilmington Potomacs in 1925.

References

External links
 and Baseball-Reference Black Baseball stats and Seamheads
  and Seamheads

1896 births
1980 deaths
Baltimore Black Sox players
Indianapolis ABCs players
Detroit Stars players
Bacharach Giants players
New York Black Yankees players
Lincoln Giants players
Homestead Grays players
Dayton Marcos players
Washington Potomacs players
Wilmington Potomacs players
Negro league baseball managers
Sportspeople from Roanoke, Virginia
Baseball players from Virginia
Baseball players from Baltimore
Baseball catchers
20th-century African-American sportspeople